The Russian Space Forces are the space force branch of the Russian Aerospace Forces. Having been reestablished following August 1, 2015 merger between the Russian Air Force and the Russian Aerospace Defence Forces after the independent arm of service was dissolved in 2011.

The Russian Space Forces were originally formed on August 10, 1992, alongside the creation of the Russian Armed Forces. The organization shared control of the Baikonur Cosmodrome with Roscosmos, the Federal Space Agency. It also operated the Plesetsk and the Svobodny Cosmodromes. However the Russian Space Forces were dissolved in July 1997 and incorporated into the Strategic Missile Forces.

The Russian Space Forces were once again reformed as an independent troop on June 1, 2001, under a military reorganization. However, by December 2011, it was dissolved once again and this time replaced by the Russian Aerospace Defence Forces.

On August 1, 2015, the Russian Air Force and the Russian Aerospace Defence Forces were merged to form the Russian Aerospace Forces. The Russian Space Forces were reestablished as a result, and are now one of three sub-branches of the new military branch.

History

Soviet Strategic Missile Forces space troops 
The Soviet Space Troops date back to February 12, 1955, when the Central Committee of the Communist Party of the Soviet Union and the Council of Ministers of the Soviet Union issued a joint executive order for the establishment of Scientific Research and Testing Range for the development of space exploration technology, codenamed Tayga Installation (Обект «Тайга»). The range was formally established on June 2, 1955, on Plot 10 - Zarya in Kyzylorda Region of the Kazakh Soviet Socialist Republic, when the General Staff of the Soviet Army established the structure and manpower requirements of the range and assigned the formal designation of 5th Scientific Research and Testing Range (5th SRTR, 5-й Научно-исследовательский испытательный полигон (5-й НИИП)).

From the beginning in the Soviet Union Space exploration was a military activity (unlike in the United States where it was the province of the civilian NASA). It was an integral part of the Soviet strategic ballistic missile force and by the time of the range's creation in 1955 this was the portfolio of the Deputy Minister of Defence for Special Weaponry and Rocket Technology. The first appointee (since March 1955) was (at the time) Marshal of Artillery, later Chief Marshal Of Artillery Mitrofan Ivanovich Nedelin. On December 17, 1959, Marshal Nedelin's Deputy Minister apparatus was transformed into the Strategic Missile Forces (RVSN).

As a military unit the range received the designation Military Detachment 11284 (войсковая часть 11284). The range was initially commanded by a Colonel of the RVSN, but it had an extensive force structure of division equivalent with its own aviation (the 28th Separate Composite Aviation Squadron, 28-я отдельная смешанная авиаэскадрилья and the 6th Separate Aviation Flight, 6-е отдельное авиационное звено), a missile assembly brigade, its own railway network,  security, logistics, medical units and flight measurement units as far away as the Kamchatka Peninsula.

As a clear indication of the indivisible connection between the Soviet Strategic Missile Forces and the Soviet space program the 627th Missile Regiment (627-й Ракетный полк) was reassigned from the 28th Guards Missile Division to the 5th SRTR on August 1, 1961. On October 19, 1961, its designation changed to the 43rd Separate Engineer Testing Detachment (43-я отдельная инженерно-испытательная часть (51-я ОИИЧ)). While subordinated to the Baykonur Cosmodrome the 43rd SET Detachment conducted the state evaluation program of the R-16U type ICBM and accomplished the first launch from an underground shaft on July 13, 1962.

The unit also had the task to demonstrate Soviet ballistic missiles to foreign delegations. For example, the demonstration launch for the French President Charles de Gaulle on June 25, 1966. The 43rd SET Det. was disbanded in 1968. Another operational unit transferred to the 5th SRTR was the 676th Missile Regiment (676-й ракетный полк), Military Detachment 44083 (в/ч 44083) of the 14th Missile Division, reassigned to the Range on April 10, 1961.

On January 25, 1962, its designation changed to 51st Separate Engineer Testing Detachment (51-я отдельная инженерно-испытательная часть (51-я ОИИЧ)), but the number 44083 was retained. The Detachment operated three surface launch pads and three underground launch shafts for the R-9A ICBMs. It was disbanded on December 7, 1971.

The 311th Missile Regiment of the 49th Guards Missile Division transferred to the Range on October 13, 1962, and changed designation to the 6th Separate Engineer Testing Detachment (6-я отдельная инженерно-испытательная часть (6-я ОИИЧ)). The regiment, later the detachment, had military number 44108 (в/ч 44108), which changed in 1966 to 45856.

The Soviet space troops achieved the first successful launch of a human into space on April 12, 1961. As a maskirovka measure the Soviet TASS news agency mentioned the cosmodrome under the name Baykonur (Байконур) by the name of the nearest train station of the Trans-Caspian railway. The Soviet military internally used  the geographic designation of Tyuratam (Тюратам) from the closest Kazakh village. On the same day the 5th SRTR received its battle standard as a military formation.

While heavily involved in the Soviet space program, the Range simultaneously carried out the task of being the test center for the country's ICBM force. For that reason it had four test directorates (roughly brigade equivalents):

 1st Test Directorate (1-е Испытательное управление (1 ИУ) (в/ч 44275)), testing ICBMs of the OKB Korolev;
 2nd Test Directorate (2-е Испытательное управление (2 ИУ) (в/ч 54333)), testing ICBMs of the OKB Yangel;
 3rd Test Directorate (3-е Испытательное управление (3 ИУ) (в/ч 63670, from 25.04.1964: 68526)), testing ICBMs of the OKB Korolev;
 4th Test Directorate (4-е Испытательное управление (4 ИУ) (в/ч 26360)), testing ICBMs of the OKB Chelomey.

The 1st and the 2nd Test Directorates were the ones, who successfully carried out Yuri Gagarin's Vostok 1 spacecraft launch (the 3rd and 4th were not yet formed at the time), which once again comes as a testament for the indivisibility of the early Soviet space troops from the RVSN.

After the Baykonur Cosmodrome another space-related formation was added in 1957, when the Command and Measurement Complex for Control of Space Vehicles (Командно-измерительный комплекс управления космическими аппаратами (КИК УКА)) was formed initially in Bolshevo, later transferred to Krasnoznamensk, Moscow Oblast. Also in 1957 the construction of a missile launch range for the testing of R-7 ICBMs started near Mirny, Arkhangelsk Oblast, which later became the Plesetsk Cosmodrome.

In 1964, in order to bring the various space-related units and establishments together, the Soviet Ministry of Defence formed the Central Directorate for Space Assets of the Missile Troops of Strategic Purpose (Центральное управление космических средств Ракетных войск стратегического назначения (ЦУКОС РВСН). In 1970 the Directorate was upgraded from a Central to a Main Directorate (Главное управление космических средств (ГУКОС РВСН).

Independent troops 
In 1981 the Main Directorate was taken out of the RVSN and subordinated to the Soviet General Staff with the corresponding re-designation from ГУКОС РВСН to ГУКОС ГШ ВС СССР. In 1986 the Main Directorate for Space Assets of the Ministry of Defence was reformed into the Directorate of the Chief of Space Assets and upgraded from a directorate under the General Staff, to a directorate directly subordinated to the Ministry of Defence (Управление начальника космических средств МО СССР).

After the collapse of the USSR in 1992 the Directorate of the Chief of Space Assets of the Ministry of Defence was reformed into a separate combat arm (род войск центрального подчинения) - Military Space Forces (Военно-космические силы (ВКС)). This is the moment when the Space Troops legally became a separate arm. Also noted should be the difference in designation. The Military Space Forces (Военно-космические силы) were a separate arm under the Ministry of Defence. They later became part of the Aerospace Forces (Воздушно-космические силы). These are different entities and it is important to take this into consideration in order to avoid mixing up the two, because they share the same acronym in Russian - ВКС (VKS).

Anti-Missile and Anti-Space Defence Troops 

On March 30, 1967, a Directorate of the Chief of Anti-Missile and Anti-Space Defence (Управление командующего войсками противоракетной и противокосмической (УКВ ПРО и ПКО)), under Lieutenant-General of Artillery Yuri Votintsev, was formed within the Soviet Air Defence Forces. In February 1971 the 1st Division for Warning Against Missile Attack (1st Division WAMA, 1-я Дивизия предупреждения о ракетном нападении (1-я дПРН)) was formed with HQ in Solnechnegorsk, the 57th Separate Radiotechnical Nod in Olenegorsk, Murmansk Oblast and the 129th Separate Radiotechnical Nod in Skrunda, Latvian SSR.

The 2nd Division for Space Observation (2nd Division SO, 2-я Дивизия разведки космического пространства (2-я дРКП)) followed in July 1973 with HQ in Serpukhov-15, the 145th Center for Space Control and 1069th Command Center (both in the closed military town of Noginsk-9, east of Moscow), the 46th Separate Radiotechnical Nod in Mishelyovka, Irkutskaya Oblast and the 49th Separate Radiotechnical Nod in the closed military town of Balkhash-9, Kazakh SSR.

In 1965 began the formation of a Space Control System (Система контроля космического пространства (ЦККП)). The headquarters was constructed in the Noginsk-9 closed military town east of Moscow. On October 7, 1965, the unit received the Military Unit designation 28289 (в/ч 28289). On October 1, 1966, a directive of the General Staff reformed the unit into the 45th Division for Space Control (45th Division SC, 45-я Дивизия контроля космического пространства) under the Air Defence Force.

In 1977 the 1st Division WAMA was expanded into the 3rd Separate Army of Special Purpose for Warning Against Missile Attack (3-я Отдельная армия предупреждения о ракетном нападении особого назначения (3-я ОА ПРН ОН)) and took over the 2nd Division SO. In 1978 the 9th Separate Corps for Anti-Missile Defence (9-й Отдельный корпус противоракетной обороны (9-й ОК ПРО)) was added to the Directorate of the Chief of Anti-Missile and Anti-Space Defence.

The Corps was originally formed on January 22, 1962, in Moscow as the Command of the 81st Radiotechnical Center (Управление РТЦ-81, Military Unit 16451 (в/ч 16451)). The unit moved later to Pavshino in 1963. In 1965 it was transformed into Directorate of the Chief of Anti-Missile Defence Troops of the Moscow Air Defence District (Управление начальника войск ПРО московского округа ПВО), Military Unit 75555 (в/ч 75555) and later in the same year moved to Solnechnogorsk. In 1972 it was reformed as the Second Directorate of the Commander of the Anti-Missile Defence Troops of the Moscow Air Defence District (Второе управление начальника войск ПРО московского округа ПВО). In 1976 it was reformed again, transferred from the Moscow ADD directly to the High Command of the Air Defence Force (Главное командование Войск ПВО) and correspondingly the designation changed to Second Directorate of the Commander of the Anti-Missile Defence Troops (Второе управление начальника войск ПРО).

Two years later in 1978 it relocated again to Akulovo, Moscow Oblast. It was reformed into the 9th Separate Corps for Anti-Missile Defence (9-й Oтдельный корпус противоракетной обороны (9-й ОК ПРО)). In 1988 the 45th Division SC was expanded into the 18th Separate Corps for Space Control (18-й Отдельный корпус контроля космический пространства). The 18th Separate Corps was reduced back into the 45th Division by the mid-1990s. It is still active today as the Main Centre for Reconnaissance of Situation in Space.

In 1992 the Anti-Missile and Anti-Space Defence Troops (Войска противоракетной и противокосмической обороны) of the Air Defence Force were renamed to the Missile and Space Defence Troops (Войска ракетно-космической обороны). In 1995 the HQ of the 9th Separate Corps AMD relocated to Sofrino-1, Pushkin District, Moscow Oblast. On October 1, 1998, the Corps was reduced into the 9th Division for Anti-Missile Defence and transferred from the Air Defence Force to the Missile Troops of Strategic Purpose. The division is still active today.

In 1997 the Missile and Space Defence Troops and the Military Space Troops were transferred to the RVSN. In the view of some experts, the merger of the Space Troops and the Anti-Missile and Anti-Space Troops and their subordination to the RVSN was a mistake that prevented the Russian military from developing space-based capabilities. Russian Public TV comment on the matter:

On October 1, 1998, the 3rd Separate Army for Missile Space Defence of Special Purpose (3-я Отдельная армия РКО особого назначения (3-я ОА РКО (ОН)) was reduced into the 1st Division for Early Warning Against Missile Attack (1-я Дивизию раннего предупреждения о ракетном нападении).

On June 1, 2001, the Missile and Space Defence Troops and the Military Space Troops were detached from the RVSN into the separate Space Troops directly under the General Staff. Colonel General Anatoly Perminov was appointed to lead the new Space Forces. He was succeeded by General Vladimir Popovkin in 2004 and General Oleg Ostapenko in 2008 until dissolution in 2011.

On August 1, 2015, the Space Forces were absorbed into the newly established Russian Aerospace Forces.

Structure
The main tasks of the Russian Space Forces are informing the higher political leaders and military commanders of missile attacks as soon as possible, ballistic missile defence, and the creation, deployment, maintenance and control of in-orbit space vehicles, like the new Persona reconnaissance satellite. For example, the Space Forces operate the GLONASS global positioning system. The commander of the Space Forces Colonel General Vladimir Popovkin said in January 2006 that 18 GLONASS satellites would be in orbit by 2008. In October 2010 the system became fully operational.

Formations of the Space Forces included the 3rd Missile-Space Defence Army, and a Division of Warning of Missile Attack, both with their headquarters at Solnechnogorsk near Moscow. Installations and assets include the Hantsavichy Radar Station in Belarus, along with a number of other large warning radars, and the A-135 anti-ballistic missile system which protects Moscow and the Peresvet anti-air laser combat system which protects strategic missiles.

There is an optical tracking facility, the Okno (Window) complex near the town of Nurek in central Tajikistan that is intended to monitor objects in space. The Okno is capable of tracking objects  from Earth, the space forces said when it °was put on duty in 2002. The facility involves telescope-like equipment housed in several large spheres, similar to the U.S. GEODSS system.

3rd Missile-Space Defence Army, status in 2002
1st Division of Warning of Missile Attack – HQ: Solnechnogorsk
East Oko Headquarters – Komsomolsk-na-Amure (Pivan-1)
West Oko Headquarters – Kurilovo (Serpukhov-15)
Radar Site (ORTU) RO-1 Olenegorsk – Radar Dnepr (Hen House)
Radar Site RO-5 – Beregovo, Ukraine – Radar Dnepr (Hen House, under Ukrainian control, all Ukrainian personnel)
Radar Site RO-4 – Sevastopol area, Ukraine – Radar Dnepr (Hen House, under Russian control, all Russian personnel)
Radar Site OS-2 – Balkhash, Kazakhstan – Radar Dnepr (Hen House)
Radar Site OS-1 – Mishelevka, Irkutsk – Radar Dnepr (Hen House)
Radar Site RO-30 – Pechora – Radar Daryal (Pechora)
Radar Site RO-7 – Gabala, Azerbaijan – Radar Daryal (Pechora)
Radar Site Gantcevichi, Belarus – Radar Volga
Radar Site – Komsomolsk-na-Amure – Radar Duga-2 (Steel Yard)
Radar Site Sofrino, in common with PRO – Radar Don-2 (Pill Box)

9th Division of Defence Against Missiles (:ru:9-я дивизия ПРО) – HQ: Sofrino  (A-135 anti-ballistic missile system)
Missile Site – Novopetrovska – 51Т6
Missile Site – Klin – 51Т6
Missile Site – Shodna – 53Т6
Missile Site – Turakovo (Aleksandrov) – 51Т6
Missile Site – Korolev – 53Т6
Missile Site – Litkarino – 53Т6
Missile Site – Vnukovo – 53Т6
Missile Site – Kolodkino – 51Т6
Radar Site – Sofrino – Radar Don-2N (Pill Box)
Radar Site – Stremilovo (Chekhov-7) – Radar Dunay-3U (Cat House)
Radar Site – Kubinka – Radar Dunay-M (Dog House)

45th Division of Space Control – HQ: Noginsk area
Optical Electronic Complex Okno (Window) – Object 7680 – Nurek, Tajikistan
Laser Radar Krona ОРТУ – Zelenchukskaya, Cherkessk Area
Also are used Radar Site Sofrino, Balkhash, Mishelevka

2018
 15th Aerospace Forces Army

Titov Main Test and Space Systems Control Centre
 Main Centre for Missile Attack Warning
Main Space Intelligence Centre

 Plesetsk Cosmodrome

Ranks and rank insignia 
Officer ranks

Other ranks

Commanders

See also
United States Space Command
United States Space Force
Air Force Space Command
People's Liberation Army Strategic Support Force
Awards and emblems of the Ministry of Defence of the Russian Federation

References

External links

 Russia Create a Robot for Open Space 
 Russian military spacecraft
 Russian Space Forces poster

 
Military of Russia
Military units and formations established in 1992
1992 establishments in Russia
Military units and formations disestablished in 2011
2011 disestablishments in Russia
Space warfare
Space units and formations